Mirador is an elevated metro station on the Line 5 of the Santiago Metro, in Santiago, Chile. A footbridge connects the concourse level to the Mall Florida Center. The station was opened on 5 April 1997 as part of the inaugural section of the line, from Baquedano to Bellavista de La Florida.

Like the older elevated stations on the Line 5, Mirador was upgraded to support longer trains. The old side platforms were five-car long, but the renovation allows the platforms to serve seven-car trains.

References

Santiago Metro stations
Railway stations opened in 1997